Hypatopa plebis is a moth in the family Blastobasidae. It is found in Costa Rica.

The length of the forewings is 4.1–5.5 mm. The forewings are brownish grey intermixed with pale brownish-grey scales scattered throughout the middle area from the base to the crossvein of the cell. The hindwings are translucent pale brown.

Etymology
The specific name is derived from Latin plebs (meaning the people).

References

Moths described in 2013
Hypatopa